Beijing Chaoyang Hospital  is a hospital in Chaoyang District, Beijing. It is subordinate to the Beijing Municipal Healthcare Bureau. It is the third clinical hospital of the medical school of Capital Medical University. The hospital has 3,600 medical and support staff members and room for 1,910 patients.

The hospital was founded on February 24, 1958.

See also

 List of hospitals in Beijing

References

External links

 Beijing Chao-Yang Hospital
 Beijing Chao-Yang Hospital 

Hospitals in Beijing
Buildings and structures in Chaoyang District, Beijing
Municipal hospitals
1958 establishments in China
Hospital buildings completed in 1958
Capital Medical University